The Zenith CH 150 Acro Zenith is a Canadian single-engine, low wing, all-aluminum aircraft designed by Chris Heintz and produced by Zenair in kit form for amateur construction. The aircraft is intended for aerobatic use and was introduced at the Experimental Aircraft Association convention in 1980.

The CH 150 is one of only six amateur-built aircraft types specifically approved by Transport Canada for aerobatics, without other restrictions.

Development
After emigrating to Canada and setting up Zenair to sell plans and kits for amateur construction of his Zenith two seat-light aircraft, the German aircraft designer Chris Heintz started design of a smaller, single seat development of the Zenith, the Zenair CH 100 Mono-Zenith. The first CH 100 made its maiden flight on 8 May 1975, powered by a 55 hp (41 kW) Volkswagen air-cooled engine of 1600 cc. Heintz used the Mono-Zenith as a starting point to develop a single-seat aircraft for aerobatic training and competition flying, the resulting aircraft, the CH 150 Acro-Zenith making its maiden flight on 19 May 1980. It was designed to be powered by engines of between 100–180 hp (75–134 kW) and had a tailwheel undercarriage instead of the nosewheel undercarriage of the earlier aircraft. Zenair continued to produce kits until 1988.

In a 1983 advertisement Zenair described the design goals of the CH150:

Specifications Zenair CH-150

See also

Notes

References

Taylor, John W. R. Jane's All The World's Aircraft 1982-83. London:Jane's Yearbooks, 1982. .

External links

1980s Canadian sport aircraft
Homebuilt aircraft
CH 150
Single-engined tractor aircraft
Low-wing aircraft
Aerobatic aircraft
Aircraft first flown in 1980